Epipsestis longipennis is a moth in the family Drepanidae. It is found in Nepal.

The wingspan is 29–40 mm. The forewings are pale grey, with pinkish suffusion except on the median and subterminal areas.
The hindwings are pale ochreous grey.

References

Moths described in 1982
Thyatirinae